I Think of You is Perry Como's 20th 12" long-play album released by RCA Records.

A review from The Gramophone said of this album; ". . .  Mr. Como takes a vocal look at songs which have been hits in recent months for other artists . . . In fact, he makes every song his own with an effortless facility possessed by very few artists, and the LP is an undiluted pleasure from beginning to end." This album continues the formula of the previous LP release by including a majority selection of soft pop/rock from the charts of 1970-1971 by artists such as Simon and Garfunkel, Glen Campbell, The Carpenters, Bread, Lobo, Ocean and others.

Track listing

Side one
"Me and You and a Dog Named Boo" (Words and Music by Kent LaVoie)
"If" (Words and Music by David A. Gates)
"Yesterday I Heard the Rain" (Music by Canache Armando Manzanero with lyrics by Gene Lees)
"Dream Baby (How Long Must I Dream)" (Words and Music by Cindy Walker)
"Where Do I Begin" (Music by Francis Lai with lyrics by Carl Sigman)
"I Think of You" (Music by Francis Lai with lyrics by Rod McKuen)

Side two
"Someone Who Cares" (Words and Music by Alex Harvey)
"For All We Know" (Music by Fred Karlin with lyrics by Arthur James and Robb Wilson)
"Put Your Hand In The Hand" (Words and Music by Gene MacLellan)
"My Days of Loving You" (Words and Music by Eddie Snyder and Richard Ahlert)
"Bridge over Troubled Water" (Words and Music by Paul Simon)

References

External links
Perry Como Discography

Perry Como albums
1971 albums
Albums produced by Don Costa
RCA Victor albums